Sheikh Muhammad Rohani(1220-1305 AD)(Pashto:شيخ محمد روحانى) also known as Shah Muhammad Rohani and Rohani Ba Ba was a Sufi cleric born around 1220 AD. The cleric, whose shrine in southern Afghanistan attracts thousands of Sufi visitors every year, is said to have migrated to current day Afghanistan in the later parts of the 13th century AD during the decline of the Abbasid Caliphate in Baghdad. He was a disciple of the renowned Sheikh Rukn-e-Alam.

The demise of the Abbasid dynasty in Baghdad in 1258 AD triggered a mass exodus of Islamic scholars and spiritual leaders from Baghdad fearing persecution at the hands of Turko-Mongol invaders. Some of the Abbasid members migrated westward and established yet another dynasty in Egypt that lasted until 1519.  Most of the Abbasid cadre migrated southeastward to Iran, Central Asia, Afghanistan, and parts of India.

The descendants of Sheikh Muhammad Rohani in the Bannu region of Pakistan and parts of Western Afghanistan identify as "Shah," "Said" or "Sheikh" to claim hereditary spiritual honor.  Afghan ethnographers refer to the descendants of Sheikh Muhammad Rohani as Sayyid. 
 The ancestors of the Fermuli tribe were guided to Islam by Sheikh Mohammad Rohani. He was the spiritual leader,  "Pir," of the Banuchi tribe in Bannu where the cleric is still held in great esteem.

According to Mohammad Hayat Khan, the author of the acclaimed reference book on Afghan tribes Hayat-i-Afghani, Sheikh Muhammad Rohani and his son Sheikh Naikbin aided the Banuchi tribe gain control of the Bannu region after Mangal and Hani tribes reneged on their promises to deliver the customary ten percent tax to the family of the Sheikh. In 1504, when the Moghul emperor, Zahiru'din Muhammad Babur, conquered southern Afghanistan, he noted the shrine of this saint in Zurmat at a spring, high on a hilltop.   The descendants of the Sheikh were allowed to collect and appropriate local taxes during the reign of Moghul emperor Aurangzeb Alamgir but the emperor's son Bahadur Shah discontinued this trend.  Nevertheless the Sheikhan of Bannu were exempt from Mogul and later Durrani taxes until 1847 when Sir Herbert Edwardes, a British colonial officer, levied six percent tax on the annual income of the tribe. Following the imposition of colonial taxes large numbers of this community migrated to southern Afghanistan.

In 2017 the government of Afghanistan named a district after this saint. The district of Rohani Baba is located in Paktia Province in southern Afghanistan.

Sheikh Mohammad had five sons from two wives. Sheikh Naikbin and Sheikh Fateh-ul-din settled in Bannu and Ghaznin. Their descendants are known as Faqirkhail and Fatehkhail. Sheikh Ismail and Sheikh Ahmad settled in the Arghistan basin and Khwaja Arman hills. Their descendants took the name of Ismailzai and Ahmadkhail. A fifth son was Sheikh Nasr-ul-din.

References

External links

See also 
Sayyid

Rukn-e-Alam

Abbasid Caliphate

Afghan Sufi religious leaders
Afghan Sufis
1220 births
1305 deaths